Radio Television of Vojvodina (Rusyn: Радіо Телебачення Воєводини; abbr. РТВ/RTV) is the regional public broadcaster in the Serbian province of Vojvodina. Its headquarters is in Novi Sad.

History

Formerly, it was known as Radio Television Novi Sad ( (РТНС)/ (RTNS)). The television service was launched in 1975 on the basis of the regional Radio Television Belgrade relay transmitters. In 1992 Radio Television Novi Sad, together with Radio Television Belgrade (RTB) and Radio Television Pristina (RTP), became a part of Radio Television of Serbia, with RTNS serving as the network affiliate for Vojvodina providing multilingual programming in addition to RTS' national programs.

In 1999, the RTNS studios in the Mišeluk neighborhood of Novi Sad were bombed and destroyed by the NATO airforce. After the war, the RTNS was moved to the new building in the city centre.

In May 2006, the Radio Television of Serbia (Public Service of Serbia), based in Belgrade, ended its local services in Vojvodina, and with the reorganization of broadcasting services, Radio Television of Vojvodina (Public Service of Vojvodina), with headquarters in Novi Sad, was now formed on the basis of the old RTNS and part of the RTS bureaus for the region.

Languages
Radio Television of Vojvodina produces programmes in 10 languages: Serbian, Hungarian, Croatian, Slovak, Rusyn, Romanian, Romany, Macedonian, Bunjevac language and, since 2011, German.

Certain TV shows are also translated into Sign language. In addition, Serbian-subtitled versions of Deutsche Welle's English-language programmes are broadcast.

Radio 
RTV has the following radio channels:
Radio Novi Sad 1 (Радио Нови Сад 1), in Serbian
Radio Novi Sad 2 (Радио Нови Сад 2), in Hungarian 
Radio Novi Sad 3 (Радио Нови Сад 3), in Croatian, Slovak, Rusyn, Romanian and Romany

Television

Current channels
Rаdio television of Vojvodina 1 (Радио телевизија Војводине 1), in Serbian.
Radio television of Vojvodina 2 (Рaдио телевизија Војводине 2), in Serbian and minority languages.

Former channels

1999 to 2006
Before the transformation of television into Radio Television of Vojvodina, the Radio Television Novi Sad had two channels:
TV Novi Sad 1 (TВ Нoви Сад 1)
TV Novi Sad 2 (ТВ Нови Сад 2)

Before 1999
Before the NATO bombing, the Radio Television Novi Sad had two channels:
TV Novi Sad (ТВ Нови Сад)
TV Novi Sad plus (TВ Нови Сад плус)

Programming

International

Domestic
 Čarde na Dunavu
 Kuhinjica
 Njuškanje

See also
Radio Television of Serbia
List of television stations in Serbia

References

External links 

Television stations in Serbia
Publicly funded broadcasters
Multilingual broadcasters
Culture of Vojvodina
Mass media in Novi Sad
Television channels and stations established in 1975
1949 establishments in Yugoslavia
State media